Kara Hayward (born November 17, 1998) is an American actress. She is known for her lead role as Suzy Bishop in the 2012 feature film Moonrise Kingdom, which earned her a nomination for the Young Artist Award for Best Leading Young Actress in a Feature Film in 2013. Three years later, she played Emily Parris, one of the lead roles in The Sisterhood of Night.

Early life and career
Hayward was born and raised in Andover, Massachusetts. She went to an open casting call for Moonrise Kingdom and was chosen for the role of Suzy Bishop. It was her first audition for a feature film. She had no professional acting experience prior to being cast.

USA Today ran a feature on Hayward and her Moonrise Kingdom co-star Jared Gilman on May 22, 2012.

She moved to Los Angeles after graduating high school, saying, "I know what I want to do." Soon after, she got the role of Iris Deerborne in To the Stars.

Personal life
Hayward has been a member of Mensa since she was nine years old. She attended Andover High School, a public school in Andover, Massachusetts.

Filmography

Film

Television

References

External links

Actresses from Massachusetts
American child actresses
American film actresses
Living people
Mensans
People from Andover, Massachusetts
1998 births
21st-century American actresses